Infamia (English title: Disgrace) is a Mexican telenovela produced by Fernando Chacón for Televisa in 1981.

Susana Dosamantes and Julio Alemán starred as protagonists, while Hilda Aguirre starred as antagonist.

Plot 
Lidia Santana is a married woman and rich man older than her, David Montalvo. They have a son, Tony. But Lydia is not happy because David is a cold and sullen, and only married him out of spite, as the great love of his life Victor Andreu abandoned in his youth. One day, while Lidia is buying wedding anniversary gift for her husband, Victor meets. Both are surprised to find after so many years, but everyone goes home. Victor has never stopped loving Lydia think much about it despite being married to a sweet and loving wife, Alma, who has a daughter, Lolita.

Days after David who did not come home the night of his birthday, decided to organize a party to celebrate, even if they have already spent days. Lidia and Victor agree that party, talk and find that they have never ceased to love. However, the two will stand Sandra Morgado, a frivolous and unscrupulous woman friend says Alma but has always been in love with Victor and Lydia used to destroy the marriage of Victor and Lydia happened to pull off the road and stay with Victor.

Cast 
Julio Alemán as Victor Andreu
Susana Dosamantes as Lidia Santana
Norma Lazareno as Alma
Sergio Bustamante as David Montalvo
Nelly Meden as Matilde
Juan Peláez as Alejandro
Enrique Becker as César
Claudia Guzmán as Dorita
Angelita Castany as Bárbara
Carmen Salas as Betty
Enrique Rubio Dosamantes as Tony
Alfonso Munguia as Rolando Fuentes
Karmin Marcelo as Mónica Palacios
Bárbara Gil as Emilia
Hilda Aguirre as Sandra Morgado
Yolanda Ciani as Elvira Jimenez
Carlos Cámara as Inspector Carmona
Luis Torner as Andrés
Rafael Banquells as Dr.Navarro
Fernando Roblesas 
Miguel Córcega 
Teo Tapia
Felix Santaella
Antonio Ruiz
Veronica Langer
Paulina Lazareno as Paulita

References

External links

1981 telenovelas
Mexican telenovelas
1981 Mexican television series debuts
1982 Mexican television series endings
Spanish-language telenovelas
Television shows set in Mexico City
Televisa telenovelas